The Lytton Road Assembly Rooms were built by E. Fergusson Taylor in New Barnet around 1870.

Film pioneer Birt Acres gave a display of moving pictures to the Lyonsdown Photographic Society there on 10 January 1896.

The building became a cinema in 1925 and was replaced with a purpose built building in 1926 known as The Hippodrome, the New Barnet Kinema, the New Barnet Picture Theatre, and The Regal from 1933. It later became a Mecca bingo hall, a snooker club, and finally a Quazer laser war games centre. It was demolished in 1999 and the flats known as Clivedon Court were built on the site.

References 

Cinemas in London
New Barnet
Demolished buildings and structures in London
Buildings and structures demolished in 1999